Melvin James Berman (14 January 1915 – 20 February 1996), was a prominent land developer in Maryland. He was instrumental in the creation of Columbia, Maryland along with his development partner James Rouse.

In 1932, Melvin J. Berman moved from DeFuniak Springs, Florida near the Alabama border to Howard County. He hitchhiked to Baltimore, working in the dairy business for his uncle. He met his first business partner, a dairy distributor, Arthur V. Robinson soon after. Berman partnered with his younger brother Wolford also. In 1952 the assets of Highland Farm#2 "Olney Acres" became available at auction. In November 1955 Robinson became a member of the Maryland and Virginia Milk Producers Association Inc. Robinson used the association money to purchase Olney Acres dairy farm in Howard County, Maryland from his partner Berman for $1,000,000. He hired Berman, and used company funds to buy additional property surrounding the farm while providing salaries to each other from the cooperative. Roberts then resold the properties to himself and his family, and resold them again to Aladdin Construction Corporation developer Joseph Martelleni, forming Hammond Village in the process. In 1961 Berman and Robinson also partnered on a second milk plant in New York. Robinson did not have to appear in trial for fraud, because he died in a takeoff crash his twin engine aircraft from Baltimore.

In 1954, they built the Ingleside Shopping center, from onsite offices, The Investment Corporation of Maryland purchased and developed the J Frank Gwynn farm in what would eventually become Columbia Maryland.

In 1950, Berman started land development, building the Laurel Shopping Center.

Early life
The Berman family has Southern Jewish roots. His family had a presence in Opp, Alabama where Benjamin Buford Blue Berman, Melvin's grandfather, was born. When Melvin was 18 months old, his family moved to DeFuniak Springs, a small town on the Florida Panhandle near the Alabama border. In the 1930s, amidst the hardships of the Great Depression, Melvin Berman left Florida at the age of 17, hitchhiking to Baltimore.

Columbia
In 1958 Berman became a founding member of the shopping center development company, Community Research and Development along with James Rouse, later becoming director of The Rouse Company. In 1961, Berman pursued his own Howard County for the company's next development.  In 1962, Berman took interest in a 1,032 acre parcel of land assembled by land developer Robert Moxley comprising four farm properties from the Carroll, Kahler, Wix, and his uncle James R. Moxley Sr's families. Close to 15,000 acres were desired to create a parcel large enough for an envisioned 100,000 person development. Rouse's attorney Jack Jones set up a grid system to secretly buy land through dummy corporations to keep costs low. Moxley's firm Security Realty Company (now Security Development Group Inc), negotiated most of the land deals for Jones, becoming his best client. CRD accumulated  , 10 percent of Howard County (located between Baltimore and Washington), from 140 separate owners. The $19,122,622 acquisition was funded by Rouse's former employer Connecticut General Life Insurance, at an average price of $1,500 per acre ($0.37/m2). When purchasing started, approval would have fallen on another family member, County Commissioner and land developer Norman E. Moxley. By late 1962, citizens elected an all-Republican three member council. J. Hubert Black, Charles E. Miller, and David W. Force campaigned on a slow-growth ballot, but later approved the Columbia project. In October 1963, the acquisition was revealed to the residents of Howard County, putting to rest rumors about the mysterious purchases. These had included theories that the site was to become a medical research laboratory or a giant compost heap. Ten years later, Councilman Charles E. Miller stated if he could do it over again, he wouldn't have approved Columbia. He felt exploited and felt the subsidized housing would become a problem for the rest of the county.

Berman Enterprises
Berman Enterprises is a multi-generational real estate and investment holding company founded on the principles of honesty, integrity, hard work, hands-on management, community and philanthropy. Employing a conservative financial strategy, Berman Enterprises has experienced sustained growth since brothers Melvin J. Berman and I. Wolford Berman founded the company in 1952.

Today, the Company and its affiliates own and manage more than 9 million square feet of commercial office, retail, industrial/flex and residential properties in Maryland, Virginia, Illinois, North Carolina and Pennsylvania.  The Company also owns several hundred acres of developable land representing thousands of units of residential and hundreds of thousands of square feet of commercial and retail development potential. Berman Enterprises maintains a very strong balance sheet with conservative debt ratios (many properties are held free and clear) with a focus on controlled, prudent growth. With significant cash on hand for investments, real estate acquisitions during depressed market periods and value add repositioning of these assets has become the core competency of the Company.

 In addition to its real estate activities, the Company has interests in private equity, ownership and management in commercial mortgages, retail businesses, venture capital and international business consulting.

Academy
In 1999 Hebrew Academy of Greater Washington, founded in 1944, moved to its current location in Rockville, Maryland and was renamed the Melvin J. Berman Hebrew Academy, in honor of Berman. The Berman Academy, as it is now known, started operations at the former Montgomery County Peary High School, abandoned since 1988. In 1996, the school signed a lease for the 20 acres of land, obligating itself to a nine million dollar cleanup, and giving Berman's company the right to re-purchase the land for future development.

References

1915 births
1996 deaths
20th-century American Jews
Jews and Judaism in Montgomery County, Maryland
People from Opp, Alabama
People from Columbia, Maryland
People from DeFuniak Springs, Florida
People from Laurel, Maryland